King Crimson were  a progressive rock band formed in 1968 in London, England. The band draws inspiration from a wide variety of music, incorporating elements of classical, jazz, folk, heavy metal, gamelan, industrial, electronic, experimental music and new wave. They exerted a strong influence on the early 1970s progressive rock movement, including on contemporaries such as Yes and Genesis, and continue to inspire subsequent generations of artists across multiple genres. The band earned a large cult following.

Founded by Robert Fripp, Michael Giles, Greg Lake, Ian McDonald and lyricist Peter Sinfield, the band initially focused on a dramatic sound layered with Mellotron, McDonald's saxophone and flute, and Lake's powerful lead vocals. Their debut album, In the Court of the Crimson King (1969), remains their most commercially successful and influential release, with a potent mixture of jazz, classical and experimental music. Following the sudden simultaneous departures of McDonald and Giles, with Lake also leaving very shortly afterwards, Fripp and Sinfield assumed direction of the group for In the Wake of Poseidon (1970), Lizard (1970), and Islands (1971) with Mel Collins, Boz Burrell and Ian Wallace among the band members during this period. In 1972, Fripp changed the group's instrumentation and approach, drawing from European free improvisation, and developing ever more complex compositions. With Bill Bruford, John Wetton, David Cross and, briefly, Jamie Muir, they reached what some saw as a creative peak on Larks' Tongues in Aspic (1973), Starless and Bible Black (1974), and Red (1974). Fripp disbanded this group in 1974.

In 1981, Fripp and Bruford reformed King Crimson with another change in musical direction. The new group also included Adrian Belew and Tony Levin. They drew influence from African music, gamelan, post-punk and New York minimalism. This group lasted three years, resulting in the trio of albums Discipline (1981), Beat (1982) and Three of a Perfect Pair (1984). Following a decade-long hiatus, Fripp revived the group as a sextet he called the "double trio" in 1994 adding Pat Mastelotto and Trey Gunn. This group participated in another three-year cycle of activity that included the release of Thrak (1995), and multiple concert recordings. There was a hiatus between 1997 to 2000. Four members of the previous sextet reunited in 2000 as a more industrial-oriented King Crimson, called the "double duo", releasing The Construkction of Light (2000) and The Power to Believe (2003). After a five year hiatus, the group expanded (in the person of new second drummer Gavin Harrison) for a 2008 tour celebrating the 40th anniversary of their 1968 formation.

Following another hiatus (2009–2012), during which Fripp was thought to be retired, King Crimson came together again in 2013; this time as a septet (and, later, octet) with an unusual three-drumkit frontline, and new second guitarist and singer Jakko Jakszyk. This version of King Crimson continued to tour from 2014 to 2021, and released multiple live albums, rearranging and reinterpreting music from across the band's entire 50-year career for the first time.

History

Formation 
In August 1967, drummer Michael Giles and his bassist brother Peter, pro musicians in working bands since their mid-teens in Dorset, England, advertised for a "singing organist" to join a group they were forming. Fellow Dorset musician Robert Fripp – a guitarist who neither played organ nor sang – responded, and Giles, Giles and Fripp was born. The trio recorded several quirky singles and one eclectic album, The Cheerful Insanity of Giles, Giles and Fripp. They hovered on the edge of success, and even made a television appearance, but were never able to make a commercial breakthrough.

Attempting to expand their sound, the three recruited Ian McDonald on keyboards, reeds and woodwinds. McDonald brought along two new participants: his then-girlfriend, former Fairport Convention singer Judy Dyble, whose brief tenure with the group ended when the two split, and lyricist, roadie, and art strategist Peter Sinfield, with whom he had been writing songs – a partnership initiated when McDonald had said to Sinfield (regarding his band Creation), "Peter, I have to tell you that your band is hopeless, but you write some great words. Would you like to get together on a couple of songs?" Fripp, meanwhile, saw Clouds at the Marquee Club in London which spurred him to incorporate classically inspired melodies into his writing, and utilise improvisation to find new ideas. No longer interested in Peter Giles' more whimsical pop songs, Fripp recommended that his old friend, fellow guitarist and singer Greg Lake could join to replace either Peter or Fripp himself. Peter Giles later called it one of Fripp's "cute political moves". According to Michael Giles, his brother had become disillusioned with the band's lack of success and departed before Fripp suggested Lake to fill Peter Giles' position as bassist and singer.

1968–1969: In the Court of the Crimson King 
With Fripp, McDonald, Michael Giles and Sinfield joined by Lake, the first incarnation of King Crimson was formed on 30 November 1968. They first rehearsed on 13 January 1969. Sinfield coined the band's name in "a moment of pressured panic". Sinfield had already used the term "crimson king" in a set of lyrics before his involvement with Giles, Giles and Fripp. Though King Crimson is often assumed to be a synonym for Beelzebub—prince of demons, Sinfield insisted that a "crimson king" was any ruler during whose reign there were "societal rumblings" and "sort of the dark forces of the world". According to Fripp, Beelzebub would be an anglicised form of the Arabic phrase "B'il Sabab", meaning "the man with an aim", to which he related. At this early point, McDonald was the primary composer, with vital contributions from Fripp and Lake, while Sinfield wrote all the lyrics on his own, and also designed and operated the band's unique stage lighting, being credited with "words and illumination" on the album sleeve. Inspired by the Moody Blues, McDonald suggested the group purchase a Mellotron keyboard, and this became a key component of the early Crimson sound. Sinfield described the original Crimson thus: "If it sounded at all popular, it was out. So it had to be complicated, it had to be more expansive chords, it had to have strange influences. If it sounded, like, too simple, we'd make it more complicated, we'd play it in 7/8 or 5/8, just to show off".

King Crimson made their breakthrough on 5 July 1969 by playing the Rolling Stones free concert at Hyde Park, London before an estimated 500,000 people. The debut album, In the Court of the Crimson King, was released in October 1969 on Island Records. Fripp would later describe it as having been "an instant smash" and "New York's acid album of 1970" (notwithstanding Fripp and Giles' assertion that the band never used psychedelic drugs). Who guitarist and composer Pete Townshend called the album "an uncanny masterpiece." The album contains Sinfield's gothic lyrics and its sound was described as having "dark and doom-laden visions". Its opening track "21st Century Schizoid Man" was described as "proto-metal" and the song's lyrics criticise the military involvement of the United States in Southeast Asia. In contrast to the blues-based hard rock of the contemporary British and American scenes, King Crimson presented a more Europeanised approach that blended antiquity and modernity. The band's music drew on a wide range of influences provided by all five group members. These elements included classical music, the psychedelic rock spearheaded by Jimi Hendrix, folk, jazz, military music (partially inspired by McDonald's stint as an army musician) and free improvisation.

After playing shows across England, the band toured the US with various pop and rock acts. Their first show was at Goddard College in Plainfield, Vermont. While the band found success and critical acclaim, creative tensions were already developing. Giles and McDonald, still striving to cope with King Crimson's rapid success and the realities of touring life, became uneasy with their musical direction. Although he was neither the dominant composer nor the frontman, Fripp was very much the group's driving force and spokesman, leading them into progressively darker and more intense musical areas. McDonald and Giles, now favouring a lighter and more nuanced romantic style, became increasingly uncomfortable with their position and resigned near the conclusion of the US tour. To keep the band together, Fripp offered to resign himself, but McDonald declared that King Crimson was "more (him) than them" and that he and Giles should therefore be the ones to leave. McDonald later said he "was probably not emotionally mature enough to handle it" and made a "rash decision to leave without consulting anyone". The original line-up played their last show at the Fillmore West in San Francisco on 16 December 1969, a little over one year after forming. Live recordings of the band from 1969 were released in 1997 on Epitaph.

1970–1971: the "interregnum" – In the Wake of Poseidon and Lizard 
After their first US tour, King Crimson was in a state of flux with various line-up changes, thwarted tour plans, and difficulties in finding a satisfactory musical direction. This period has subsequently been referred to as the "interregnum" – a nickname implying that the "King" (Crimson) was not properly in place during this time. Fripp became the only remaining musician in the band, with Sinfield expanding his creative role to operating synthesizers.

With Fripp and Sinfield planning for recording the second King Crimson album, In the Wake of Poseidon, the band's management booked Elton John to sing the material as a session musician amidst the uncertainty, but Fripp decided against this idea after listening to his Empty Sky album. Lake did agree to sing all the vocals, but left to form Emerson, Lake and Palmer before he could finish recording "Cadence and Cascade", for which Fripp's old school friend Gordon Haskell was brought in as a guest vocalist. Michael Giles was recruited as a session musician. Other musicians who contributed to the recording were Peter Giles playing bass guitar instead of Lake, saxophonist Mel Collins (of the band Circus) and jazz pianist Keith Tippett. Upon its release in May 1970, In the Wake of Poseidon reached No. 4 in the UK and No. 31 in the US. It received some criticism from those who thought it sounded too similar to their first album. With no set band to perform the new material, Fripp and Sinfield invited Mel Collins and Gordon Haskell to join permanently, with Haskell also handling bass as well as vocals, while Andy McCulloch joined the band as drummer. Collins would also act as occasional keyboard player and backing vocalist.

Fripp and Sinfield wrote the third album, Lizard, themselves – with Haskell, Collins and McCulloch having no say in the direction of the material. Tippett was brought back as a session player, and offered full band membership as well, but preferred to remain an occasional guest musician. Two members of Tippett's band also played on the album: Mark Charig on cornet, and Nick Evans on trombone. Robin Miller (on oboe and cor anglais) also appeared. Jon Anderson of Yes was brought in to sing a section of the album's title track, "Prince Rupert Awakes", which Fripp and Sinfield considered to be outside Haskell's natural range and style. Lizard featured stronger jazz and chamber-classical influences than previous albums. The album contains Sinfield's "phantasmagorical" lyrics, including "Happy Family" (an allegory of the break-up of the Beatles), and the title track, a suite which took up the entire second side, describing a medieval/mythological battle and its outcome.

Released in December 1970, Lizard reached No. 29 in the UK and No. 113 in the US. Described retrospectively as an "outlier", the album had been made by a group in disagreement over method and taste. The more rhythm-and-blues-oriented Haskell and McCulloch both found the music difficult to relate to, and tedious and confusing to record. Collins disliked how his parts were composed, while both Fripp and Haskell detested Sinfield's lyrics. This lineup of the band did not survive much longer than the Lizard recording sessions. Haskell quit the band acrimoniously during initial tour rehearsals after refusing to sing live with distortion and electronic effects on his voice, and McCulloch departed soon after. With Sinfield not being a musician and Fripp having seemingly given up on the band, Collins was left to search for new members.

1971–1972: the Islands band 
After a search for a drummer to replace McCulloch, Ian Wallace was secured. Fripp was re-energised by the addition of a new member, and he joined Collins and Wallace to audition singers and bassists. Vocalists who tried out included Roxy Music frontman Bryan Ferry and John Gaydon, one of the band's managers. The position eventually went to Raymond "Boz" Burrell. John Wetton was invited to join on bass, but declined in order to join Family instead. Rick Kemp (later of Steeleye Span) rehearsed with the band, but declined the final offer to formally join. Fripp decided to teach Boz to play bass rather than continue the labored auditions. Though he had not played bass before, Burrell had played enough acoustic guitar to assist him in learning the instrument quickly. Wallace was able to further instruct Burrell in functioning on the instrument in a rhythm section. With a line-up now complete, King Crimson toured in 1971 for the first time since 1969. The concerts were well received, but the musical differences between Fripp and the rest of the group, and the somewhat wilder lifestyles of Collins, Wallace and Burrell alienated the drug-free Fripp, who began to withdraw socially from his bandmates, creating further tension.

In 1971, the new King Crimson formation recorded Islands. Sinfield, who favoured a softer approach, took lyrical inspiration from Homer's Odyssey, musical inspiration from jazz players like Miles Davis and Ahmad Jamal, and a sun-drenched trip to Ibiza and Formentera. Islands featured the instrumental "Sailor's Tale", with a droning Mellotron and Fripp's banjo-inspired guitar solo; the raunchy, blues-inspired "Ladies of the Road", which featured Wallace and Collins on backing vocals; and "Song of the Gulls", which was developed from an earlier Fripp instrumental ("Suite No. 1" from Giles, Giles & Fripp's 1968 album), and would be the only time the band would utilize an orchestra. One of the band members allegedly called Islands as "an airy-fairy piece of shit".

Released in December 1971, Islands charted at No. 30 in the UK and No. 76 in the US. Following a tour of the United States, in December 1971, Fripp informed Sinfield that he could no longer work with him, and asked him to leave the band. In January 1972, the remaining band broke up acrimoniously in rehearsals, owing partially to Fripp's refusal to play a composition by Collins. He later cited this as "quality control", with the idea that King Crimson would perform the "right" kind of music.

In order to fulfil touring contracts in the United States in 1972, King Crimson reformed with the intention of disbanding immediately after the tour. Recordings from various North American dates between January and February 1972 were released as Earthbound in June of that year. The album was noted for its playing style that occasionally veered towards funk, and Burrell's scat singing on the improvised pieces, but was criticised for its sub-par sound quality. By this time, the musical rift between Fripp and the rest of the band had grown very wide indeed. Wallace, Burrell and Collins favoured improvised blues and funk. Later Fripp described this lineup at the time, was more of a jam band than an "improvising" band, an opinion with which Wallace disagreed. Personal relations actually improved during the tour to the point where most of the band decided to continue on, however Fripp opted to part company with the other three, restructuring King Crimson with new musicians, as he felt the other members wouldn't be fully engaged in the musical direction he had in mind.

1972–1975: the "European improvisers" – Larks' Tongues in Aspic, Starless and Bible Black, Red, and hiatus 

The third major line-up of King Crimson was radically different from the previous two. Fripp's four new recruits were free-improvising percussionist Jamie Muir, drummer Bill Bruford (who left Yes at a commercial peak in their career in favour of the "darker" Crimson), bassist and vocalist John Wetton, and violinist, keyboardist and flautist David Cross, whom Fripp had met when he was invited to a rehearsal of Waves, a band Cross was working in. Most of the musical compositions were collaborations between Fripp and Wetton, who each composed segments independently and fitted together those which they found compatible. With Sinfield gone, the band recruited Wetton's friend Richard Palmer-James (from the original Supertramp) as their new lyricist. Unlike Sinfield, Palmer-James played no part in artistic decisions, visual ideas, or sonic directions; his sole contributions to the group were his lyrics, sent via mail from his home in Germany. Following a period of rehearsals, King Crimson resumed touring on 13 October 1972 at the Zoom Club in Frankfurt, with the band's penchant for improvisation (and Muir's startling stage presence) gaining them renewed press attention.

In January and February 1973, King Crimson recorded Larks' Tongues in Aspic in London which was released that March. The band's new sound was exemplified by the album's two-part title track – a significant change from what King Crimson had done before, the piece emphasised the sharp instrumental interplay of the band, and drew influence from modern classical music, noisy free improv, and even heavy metal riffing. The record displayed Muir's unusual approach to percussion, which included a self-modified drum kit, assorted toys, a bullroarer, mbira, gongs, balloons, thunder sheet and chains. On stage, Muir also employed unpredictable, manic movements, bizarre clothing, and fake blood capsules (occasionally spit or applied to the head), becoming the sole example of such theatrical stage activity in the band's long history. The album reached No. 20 in the UK and No. 61 in the US. After a period of further touring, Muir departed in 1973, quitting the music industry altogether. Muir told King Crimson's management that he had decided a musician's life was not for him, and he had chosen to join a Scottish Buddhist monastery. He offered to serve a period of notice which the management declined. Instead of reiterating Muir's decision, the management informed the band and the public that Muir had sustained an onstage injury caused by a gong landing on his foot.

With Muir gone, the remaining members reconvened in January 1974 to produce Starless and Bible Black, released in March 1974 and earned them a positive Rolling Stone review. Though most of the album was recorded live during the band's late 1973 tour, the recordings were carefully edited and overdubbed to sound like a studio record, with "The Great Deceiver", "Lament" and the second half of "The Night Watch" the only tracks recorded entirely in the studio. The album reached No. 28 in the UK and No. 64 in the US. Following the album's release, the band began to divide once more, this time over performance. Musically, Fripp found himself positioned between Bruford and Wetton, who played with such force and increasing volume that Fripp once compared them to "a flying brick wall", and Cross, whose amplified acoustic violin was consistently being drowned out by the rhythm section, leading him to concentrate more on Mellotron and an overdriven electric piano. An increasingly frustrated Cross began to withdraw both musically and personally, with the result being that he was voted out of the group following the band's 1974 tour of Europe and America.

In July 1974, Fripp, Bruford, and Wetton began recording Red. Before recording began, Fripp, now increasingly disillusioned with the music industry, turned his attention to the works of Russian mystic George Gurdjieff and had a spiritual experience in which "the top of my head blew off". Though most of the album had been developed during live improvisations before Fripp retreated into himself and "withdrew his opinion", leaving Bruford and Wetton to direct the recording sessions. The album contains one live track, "Providence", recorded on 30 June 1974 with Cross playing violin. Several guest musicians (including Mel Collins and Ian McDonald) contributed to the album. Released on 6 October 1974, Red went to No. 45 in the UK and No. 66 in the US. AllMusic called it "an impressive achievement" for a group about to disband, with "intensely dynamic" musical chemistry between the band members.

Two months before the release of Red, King Crimson's future looked bright (with talks regarding founder member Ian McDonald rejoining the group). However, Fripp wished not to tour as he felt increasingly disenchanted by the group and the music industry. He also felt the world was going to drastically change by 1981 and that he had to prepare for it. Despite a band meeting while touring the US in which Fripp expressed a desire to end the band, the group did not formally disband until 25 September 1974 and later Fripp announced that King Crimson had "ceased to exist" and was "completely over for ever and ever". It was later revealed that Fripp had attempted to interest his managers in a King Crimson with McDonald (but without him), but this idea was rejected. Following the band's disbanding, the live album USA was released in May 1975, formed of recordings from their 1974 North American tour. It received some positive reviews, including "a must" for fans of the band and "insanity you're better off having". Issues with the tapes rendered some of Cross' playing inaudible, so Eddie Jobson was hired to perform violin and keyboard overdubs in a studio; further edits were also made to allow the music to fit on a single LP. Between 1975 and 1981, King Crimson were completely inactive.

1981–1984: the "rock gamelan" – Discipline, Beat, Three of a Perfect Pair, and second hiatus 

In the late autumn of 1980, having spent several years on spiritual pursuits and then gradually returning to music (playing guitar for David Bowie, Peter Gabriel and Daryl Hall, pursuing an experimental solo career, leading instrumental new wave band The League of Gentlemen), Fripp decided to form a new "first division" rock group, but had no intentions of it being King Crimson. Having recruited Bill Bruford as drummer, Fripp asked singer and guitarist Adrian Belew to join, the first time Fripp would actively seek collaboration with another guitarist in a band and therefore indicative of Fripp's desire to create something unlike any of his previous work. After touring with Talking Heads, Belew agreed to join and also become the band's lyricist. Bruford's suggestion of his bassist Jeff Berlin was rejected as Fripp thought his playing was "too busy", so auditions were held in New York: on the third day, Fripp left after roughly three auditions, only to return several hours later with Tony Levin (who got the job after playing a single chorus of "Red"). Fripp later confessed that, had he known that Levin (whom Fripp had played with in Peter Gabriel's group) was available and interested, he would have selected him without holding auditions. Fripp named the new quartet Discipline, and they went to England to rehearse and write new material. They made their live debut at Moles Club in Bath, Somerset on 30 April 1981, and completed a short tour supported by the Lounge Lizards. By October 1981, the band had opted to change their name to King Crimson.

In 1981, King Crimson recorded Discipline with producer Rhett Davies. The album displayed a very different version of the band, with newer influences including post-punk, new wave, funk, minimalism, pointillism, world music and African percussion. With a sound described in The New Rolling Stone Album Guide as having a "jaw-dropping technique" of "knottily rhythmic, harmonically demanding workouts". The title track "Discipline" was described as a postminimalist rock song. Fripp intended to create the sound of a "rock gamelan", with an interlocking rhythmic quality to the paired guitars that he found similar to Indonesian gamelan ensembles. Fripp concentrated on playing complex picked arpeggios, while Belew provided an arsenal of guitar sounds that "often mimic animal noises". In addition to bass guitar, Levin used the Chapman Stick, a ten-string two-handed tapping, hybrid guitar and bass instrument which he played in an "utterly original style". Bruford experimented with cymbal-less acoustic kits and a Simmons SDS-V electronic drum kit. The band's songs were shorter in comparison to previous King Crimson albums, and very much shaped by Belew's pop sensibilities and quirky approach to writing lyrics. Though the band's previous taste for improvisation was now tightly reined in, one instrumental ("The Sheltering Sky") emerged from group rehearsals; while the noisy, half-spoken/half-shouted "Indiscipline" was a partially written, part-improvised piece created in order to give Bruford a chance to escape from the strict rhythmic demands of the rest of the album. Released in September 1981, Discipline reached No. 41 in the UK and No. 45 in the US.

In June 1982, King Crimson followed Discipline with Beat, the first King Crimson album recorded with the same band line-up as the album preceding it. Beat is the only album where Fripp had no involvement in the original mixing; Davies and Belew undertook production duties. The album had a linked theme of the Beat Generation and its writings, reflected in song titles such as "Neal and Jack and Me" (inspired by Neal Cassady and Jack Kerouac), "Heartbeat" (inspired by Carolyn Cassady's "Heart Beat: My Life with Jack and Neal"), "The Howler" (inspired by Allen Ginsberg's "Howl") and "Waiting Man" (inspired by William Burroughs). The album contained themes of life on the road, existential angst and romanticism. While Beat was more accessible, it had the improvised "Requiem", which featured Frippertronics, a guitar technique invented by Brian Eno and Robert Fripp using a tape loop system.

Recording Beat was faced with tension with Belew suffering high stress levels over his duties as front man, lead singer, and principal songwriter. On one occasion, he clashed with Fripp and ordered him out of the studio. As Beat reached No. 39 in the UK and No. 52 in the US, King Crimson resumed touring. "Heartbeat" was released as a single which peaked at No. 57 on the Billboard Mainstream Rock chart. Around this time the band released the VHS-only '"The Noise: Live in Frejus", a record of a show played at the Arena, Frejus, France on 27 August 1982. This video is on DVD as part of the compilation Neal and Jack and Me and On (and off) The Road (1981–1984).

King Crimson's next album, Three of a Perfect Pair, was recorded in 1983 and released in March 1984. Having encountered difficulty in both writing and determining a direction for the album, the band chose to record and call the album's first half a "left side" – four of the band's poppier songs plus an instrumental – and the second half a "right side" – experimental work, improvisations that drew influence from industrial music,  plus the third part of the "Larks' Tongues in Aspic" series of compositions. The stress during the writing process and the tension between the band members manifested in both lyrical content and music, and the result is a "nerve-racking" album. The 2001 remaster of the album included the "other side", a collection of remixes and improvisational out-takes plus Levin's humorous song, "The King Crimson Barbershop". Three of a Perfect Pair peaked at No. 30 in the UK and No. 58 in the US, with "Three of a Perfect Pair" and "Sleepless" being released as singles. The last concert of the Three of a Perfect Pair tour, at the Spectrum in Montreal, Canada on 11 July 1984, was recorded and released in 1998 as Absent Lovers: Live in Montreal. Despite their conflict, the musicians remained professional on stages.

Following the 1984 tour, Fripp dissolved King Crimson for the second time, exactly ten years after dissolving the previous group. Bruford and Belew expressed some frustration over this; Belew recalled the first he had heard of the split was when he read about it in a report in Musician magazine.

1994–1999: the Double Trio – Vrooom, THRAK, and the ProjeKcts 
In the summer of 1991, Belew met with Fripp in England to express an interest in reviving King Crimson. One year later, Fripp established his Discipline Global Mobile (DGM) record label with producer David Singleton. Subsequently, DGM would be the primary home for Fripp's work, with larger album releases distributed to bigger record companies (initially Virgin records), and smaller releases handled by DGM. This afforded Fripp and his associates greater creative freedom and more control over all aspects of their work.

In late 1991, Fripp asked former Japan singer David Sylvian to join the new King Crimson band, but Sylvian declined the offer, though the two collaborated as Sylvian/Fripp. In June 1993, Fripp began to assemble a larger version of the band, joined by Belew and Levin from the 1980s quartet, Chapman Stick player Trey Gunn (a veteran of Fripp's Guitar Craft courses) and drummer Jerry Marotta, with whom Fripp had played with Peter Gabriel. After Sylvian/Fripp's closing concerts at the Royal Albert Hall in December 1993, a tour that Marotta didn't participate in, Fripp decided to ask the tour's drummer Pat Mastelotto to join instead of Marotta. Bruford wound up being the last of the 1980s group to return to the band. Fripp explained that he had a vision of a "Double Trio" with two drummers while driving along the Chalke Valley one afternoon in 1992. Bruford later said he lobbied Fripp last minute because he believed that Crimson was very much "his gig", and that Fripp had come up with a philosophical explanation for utilizing both Mastelotto and himself later. One of the conditions Fripp imposed upon Bruford if he were to return was to give up all creative control to Fripp.

Following rehearsals in Woodstock, New York, the group released the extended play Vrooom in October 1994. This revealed the new King Crimson sound, which featured the interlocking guitars of the 1980s mixed with the layered, heavier feel of the 1970s period. There was also a distinct influence from the industrial music of that time. Many of the songs were written or finalised by Belew, and displayed stronger elements of 1960s pop than before; in particular, a Beatles influence. Bruford would refer to the band as sounding like "a dissonant Shadows on steroids". As with previous line-ups, new technology was utilised, including MIDI, which Fripp used to convert Frippertronics to digital version of it called "Soundscapes", and the versatile Warr tap guitar with which Gunn replaced his Stick in 1995. King Crimson toured the album from 28 September 1994 in Buenos Aires, Argentina; portions of these concerts were released on the double live CD set B'Boom: Live in Argentina in 1995.

In October and December 1994, King Crimson recorded their eleventh studio album, THRAK. Formed mostly of revised versions of the tracks from Vrooom, plus new tracks, the album was described by Q magazine as having "jazz-scented rock structures, characterised by noisy, angular, exquisite guitar interplay" and an "athletic, ever-inventive rhythm section," while being in tune with the sound of alternative rock of the mid-1990s. Examples of the band's efforts to integrate their multiple elements could be heard on the accessible (but complex) songs "Dinosaur" and "Sex Sleep Eat Drink Dream", the more straightforward ballad "One Time", as well as "Radio I" and "Radio II"- a pair of Fripp's Soundscapes instrumentals.

King Crimson resumed touring in 1995 and into 1996; dates from October and November 1995 were recorded and released on the live album Thrakattak in May 1996, which is an hour of improvised music integrating sections from performances from the "THRAK" tour in the United States and Japan, mixed and arranged by Fripp's DGM partner, engineer David Singleton. A more conventional live recording from the period was later made available as the double CD release Vrooom Vrooom (2001), as was a full 1995 concert on the Déjà Vrooom DVD (2003).

Writing rehearsals began in May 1997 in Nashville, Tennessee. Fripp was dissatisfied with the quality of the new music being developed by the band; Longstanding friction and disagreements between himself and Bruford led to the latter deciding to leave King Crimson for good. The resulting bad atmosphere and the lack of workable material almost broke the band up altogether. Instead, the six members opted to work in four smaller groups (or "fraKctalisations", as Fripp called them) known as ProjeKcts. This enabled the group to continue developing ideas and searching for a new direction without the practical difficulty (and expense) of convening all six musicians at once. From 1997 to 1999, the first four ProjeKcts played live in the United States and the United Kingdom, and released recordings that showed a high degree of free improvisation, with influences ranging from jazz, industrial, techno and drum'n'bass. These have been collectively described by music critic J. D. Considine as "frequently astonishing" but lacking in melody. After Bruford had played four dates with Projekct One in December 1997, he left King Crimson to resume working with his own jazz group Earthworks.

2000–2003: the Double Duo – The Construkction of Light, The Power to Believe, third hiatus 
In October 1999, King Crimson began to reconvene. Tony Levin was busy working as a session musician and decided to take a hiatus from the group, so the remaining members (Fripp, Belew, Gunn and Mastelotto) formed the "Double Duo" to write and record The Construkction of Light in Belew's basement studio and garage near Nashville. Released in May 2000, the album reached No. 129 in the UK. Most of the pieces were metallic, harsh and industrial in sound. They featured a distinct electronic texture, a heavily processed electric drum sound from Mastelotto, Gunn taking over the bass role on Warr Guitar, and a different take on the interlocking guitar sound that the band had pioneered in the 1980s. With the exception of an industrial blues (sung by Belew through a voice changer under the pseudonym of "Hooter J. Johnson"), the songs were dense and complex. The album contains the fourth installment of "Larks' Tongues in Aspic". It received a negative reception for lacking new ideas. The band recorded an album of improvised instrumentals at the same time, and released them under the name ProjeKct X, on the CD Heaven and Earth.

King Crimson toured to support both albums, including double bill shows with Tool. The tour was documented in Heaven & Earth (box set). Led Zeppelin bassist John Paul Jones and his band supported Crimson on some live shows.

On 9 November 2001, King Crimson released a limited edition live extended play called Level Five, featuring three new pieces: "Dangerous Curves", "Level Five" and "Virtuous Circle", plus versions of "The Construkction of Light" and ProjeKct's "The Deception of the Thrush", followed by an unlisted track called "ProjeKct 12th and X" after one minute of silence. A second EP followed in October 2002, Happy with What You Have to Be Happy With. This featured eleven tracks (including a live version of "Larks' Tongues in Aspic, Part IV"). Half of the tracks were processed vocal snippets by Belew, and the songs themselves varied between Soundscapes, gamelan, heavy metal and blues.King Crimson released their thirteenth album, The Power to Believe, in March 2003. Fripp described it as "the culmination of three years of Crimsonising". The album incorporated, reworked and retitled versions of "Deception of the Thrush" ("The Power to Believe III"); tracks from their previous two EPs; and an extract from a Fripp Soundscape with added instrumentation and vocals. The Power to Believe reached No. 162 in the UK and No. 150 in the US. King Crimson toured in 2003 to support the album; recordings from it were used for the live album EleKtrik: Live in Japan. 2003 also saw the release of the DVD Eyes Wide Open, a compilation of the band's shows Live at the Shepherds Bush Empire (London, 3 July 2000) and Live in Japan (Tokyo, 16 April 2003).
In November 2003, Gunn left the group to pursue solo projects and was replaced by the returning Tony Levin. The band reconvened in early 2004 for rehearsals, but nothing developed from these sessions. They went on another hiatus. At this point, Fripp was publicly reassessing his desire to work within the music industry, often citing the unsympathetic aspects of the life of a touring musician, such as "the illusion of intimacy with celebrities".

On 21 September 2006, former King Crimson member Boz Burrell died of a heart attack, followed by another former member, Ian Wallace, who died of esophageal cancer on 22 February 2007.

2008: The second quintet and 40th Anniversary tour 
A new King Crimson formation was announced in 2007: Fripp, Belew, Levin, Mastelotto, and a new second drummer, Gavin Harrison. In August 2008, after a period of rehearsals, the five completed the band's 40th Anniversary Tour. The setlists featured no new material, drawing instead from the existing mid '70s era/Discipline-era/Double Trio/Double Duo repertoire. Additional shows were planned for 2009, but were cancelled due to scheduling clashes with Belew.

King Crimson began another hiatus after the 40th Anniversary Tour. Belew continued to lobby for reviving the band, and discussed it with Fripp several times in 2009 and 2010. Among Belew's suggestions was a temporary reunion of the 1980s line-up for a thirtieth anniversary tour: an idea declined by both Fripp and Bruford, the latter commenting "I would be highly unlikely to try to recreate the same thing, a mission I fear destined to failure. In December 2010, Fripp wrote that the King Crimson "switch" had been setting to "off" since October 2008, citing several reasons for this decision.

2014–2021: the "Seven-Headed Beast" and "Three Over Five" lineups 
In 2011, a band called Jakszyk, Fripp and Collins (and subtitled "A King Crimson ProjeKct") released an album called A Scarcity of Miracles. The band featured guitarist and singer Jakko Jakszyk, Fripp and former Crimson saxophonist Mel Collins as the main players/composers, with Tony Levin playing bass and Gavin Harrison playing drums. At one point, Fripp referred to the band as "P7" (ProjeKct Seven). Unusually for a ProjeKct, it was based around "finely crafted" and "mid-paced" original songs derived from improvised sessions. In August 2012, Fripp announced his retirement from the music industry, leaving the future of King Crimson uncertain.

In September 2013, Fripp announced King Crimson's return to activity with a "very different reformation to what has gone before: seven players, four English and three American, with three drummers". He cited several reasons to make a comeback, varying from the practical to the whimsical: "I was becoming too happy. Time for a pointed stick." The new line-up drew from both the previous lineup (retaining Fripp, Levin, Harrison and Mastelotto) and the Scarcity of Miracles project (Jakszyk and Collins), with Guitar Craft alumnus and former R.E.M./Ministry drummer Bill Rieflin as the seventh member. Adrian Belew was not asked to take part, thus ending his 32-year tenure in King Crimson: Jakszyk took his place as singer and second guitarist. This version of the group took on the nickname of "the Seven-Headed Beast".

In early 2014, King Crimson had no plans to record in the studio, instead playing "reconfigured" versions of past material. For the first time since 1974, the band's repertoire included songs from the run of albums between In The Court of the Crimson King and Larks' Tongues in Aspic, as well as including instrumentals from THRAK and The Power to Believe. After rehearsing in England, they toured North America from 9 September to 6 October. Recordings from the Los Angeles dates were released as Live at the Orpheum.

Tours across Europe, Canada, and Japan followed in the later half of 2015. A live recording from the Canadian leg of the tour was released as Live In Toronto. A European tour was planned for 2016. Following Rieflin's decision to take a break from music, drummer Jeremy Stacey of Noel Gallagher's High Flying Birds was called in place for dates from September.

On 7 December 2016, founding King Crimson member Greg Lake died of cancer. Another former King Crimson member, John Wetton, died of colon cancer on 31 January 2017.

On 3 January 2017, Bill Rieflin returned to King Crimson. Since the band wished to retain Jeremy Stacey, Fripp called the new lineup the "Double Quartet Formation", referencing four drummers. Consequently, King Crimson became an octet. Later on, Rieflin shifted his group role and became King Crimson's first full-time keyboard player, Fripp rechristened the lineup the "Three Over Five" (or "Five Over Three") Formation.

On 2 June 2017, King Crimson released a new live EP named "Heroes" (after the David Bowie song), as a tribute to both the artist and the album featuring the song in question, both of which featured distinctive Robert Fripp guitar contributions throughout. The video to the song won "Video of the Year" at the 2017 Progressive Music Awards. Shortly afterwards, King Crimson embarked on a United States tour beginning on 11 June and ending on 26 November. On 3 September, Robert Fripp said that his differences with Adrian Belew had been resolved and that there were "no current plans for (him) to come out with the current formation" but "the doors to the future are open." Belew confirmed this, adding "it means I may be back in the band in the future at some point." On 13 October, it was announced that Bill Rieflin would be unable to join the Three Over Five Formation on the 2017 Autumn tour in the U.S. He was temporarily replaced by Seattle-based Crafty Guitarist Chris Gibson. During 2018, King Crimson performed the extensive 33-date Uncertain Times tour through the UK and Europe between 13 June and 16 November.

On 6 April 2019, it was announced at a press conference that Rieflin would take another break from King Crimson to attend to family matters, his place on keyboards for the 2019 50th anniversary tour would be taken by Theo Travis, better known as a saxophonist, Soft Machine member and occasional duo collaborator with Robert Fripp. Although Travis joined the band for rehearsals, Fripp said on 2 May that the band had decided that it was no longer possible to have other musicians deputising for Rieflin and for this reason were "proceed(ing) as a Seven-Headed Beast" without Travis. Rieflin's parts were divided among other band members, with Fripp, Stacey, Jakszyk and Collins adding keyboards to their on-stage rigs, and Levin once again using the synthesizer he used during the '80s tours. Soon after on 11 June, King Crimson's entire discography was made available to stream online on all the major streaming platforms, as part of the band's 50th anniversary celebration.

On 24 March 2020, Bill Rieflin died of cancer. In the same year, former member Gordon Haskell died of lung cancer on 15 October.

The band toured North America and then Japan in 2021. Recordings from Washington, D.C. and Albany, New York dates were released as Music is our Friend. Because of the rising cost of services during the pandemic and old age, they took another hiatus, with no intentions for any more tours. The band has ceased activity with no plans for the future. Levin said in a late 2022 interview that, "the sense I got from Robert [Fripp] was that it's over. Maybe King Crimson will speak to him in the future in some way, and will revive its head with who-knows-what line up?"

On 9 February 2022, founding King Crimson member Ian McDonald died of cancer.

Former member cover bands 
Since the early 2000s, several bands containing former, recent or current King Crimson members have toured and recorded, performing King Crimson music.

Active between 2002 and 2005, the 21st Century Schizoid Band reunited several former King Crimson members who had played on the band's first four albums. The band featured Ian McDonald, Mel Collins, Peter Giles and Michael Giles (the latter subsequently replaced by Ian Wallace), and was fronted by Jakko Jakszyk, a decade prior to his own recruitment into King Crimson. The band engaged in several tours, played material from King Crimson's '60s and '70s catalogue, and recorded several live albums. The band disbanded upon Wallace's death in 2007.

Since 2007, Tony Levin has led the trio Stick Men, which also features Pat Mastelotto. The band was initially completed by Chapman Stick player Michael Bernier, replaced in 2010 by touch guitarist and former Fripp student Markus Reuter. This band includes (and reinterprets) King Crimson compositions in their live sets. Previously called "Tuner", Reuter and Mastelotto also play together as a duo, for which they have been known to rework the mid-1980s King Crimson instrumental "Industry" live.

Between 2011 and 2014, Stick Men and Adrian Belew's Power Trio band (Belew plus drummer Tobias Ralph and bass player Julie Slick) joined forces to play and tour as The Crimson ProjeKCt, covering the music made during the '80s and '90s. The two groups performed together from time to time, usually under names like "Belew, Levin, Mastelotto and friends".

During his solo career, including performances with the Power Trio, Adrian Belew has performed various versions of King Crimson songs.

Musical style 
King Crimson have been described musically as progressive rock, art rock, and post-progressive, with their earlier works being described as proto-prog. Their music was initially grounded in the rock of the 1960s, especially the acid rock and psychedelic rock movements. The band played Donovan's "Get Thy Bearings" in concert, and were known to play the Beatles' "Lucy in the Sky with Diamonds" in their rehearsals. However, for their own compositions, King Crimson (unlike the rock bands that had come before them) largely stripped away the blues-based foundations of rock music and replaced them with influences derived from classical composers. The first incarnation of King Crimson played the Mars section of Gustav Holst's suite The Planets live and later the band used Mars as a foundation for the song "Devil's Triangle". As a result of this influence, In the Court of the Crimson King is frequently viewed as the nominal starting point of the progressive rock movements. King Crimson also initially displayed strong jazz influences, most obviously on its signature track "21st Century Schizoid Man". The band also drew on English folk music for compositions such as "Moonchild" and "I Talk to the Wind." In the 1972 lineup, Fripp's intention was to combine the music of Jimi Hendrix, Igor Stravinsky and Béla Bartók.

The 1981 reunion of the band brought in even more elements, displaying the influence of funk, post-punk, new wave, gamelan music and late 20th century classical composers such as Philip Glass, Steve Reich, and Terry Riley. For its 1994 reunion, King Crimson reassessed both the mid-1970s and 1980s approaches in the light of new technology, intervening music forms such as electronica, drum'n'bass and techno; and further developments in industrial music, as well as expanding the band's ambient textural content via Fripp's Soundscapes looping approach.

The 2013 version of the band returned, for the most part, to the band's 1960s and 1970s influences and repertoire but addressed them via current technology and rearrangements suited to a larger ensemble of more experienced musicians, while also incorporating the New Standard Tuning used by Fripp since 1984.

Compositional approaches 

Several King Crimson compositional approaches have remained constant from the earliest versions of the band to the present. These include:

 The use of a gradually building rhythmic motif. These include "The Devil's Triangle" (an adaptation and variation on the Gustav Holst piece Mars played by the original King Crimson, based on a complex pulse in  time over which a skirling melody is played on a Mellotron), 1973's "The Talking Drum" (from Larks' Tongues in Aspic), 1984's "Industry" (from Three of a Perfect Pair) and 2003's "Dangerous Curves" (from The Power to Believe).
 An instrumental piece (often embedded as a break in a song) in which the band plays an ensemble passage of considerable rhythmic and polyrhythmic complexity. An early example is the band's initial signature tune "21st Century Schizoid Man", but the "Larks' Tongues in Aspic" series of compositions (as well as pieces of similar intent such as "THRAK" and "Level Five") go deeper into polyrhythmic complexity, delving into rhythms that wander into and out of general synchronisation with each other, but that all 'finish' together through polyrhythmic synchronisation. These polyrhythms were particularly abundant in the band's 1980s work, which contained gamelan-like rhythmic layers and continual overlaid staccato patterns in counterpoint.
The composition of difficult solo passages for individual instruments, such as the guitar break on "Fracture" on Starless and Bible Black.
The juxtaposition of ornate tunes and ballads with unusual, often dissonant noises (such as "Cirkus" from Lizard, "Ladies of the Road" from Islands and "Eyes Wide Open" from The Power to Believe).
The use of improvisation.
Ascending note structure (e.g. "Facts of Life" and "THRAK").

Improvisation 

King Crimson have incorporated improvisation into their performances and studio recordings from the beginning, some of which has been embedded into pieces such as "Moonchild", "Providence", "Requiem" and "No Warning", including passages of restrained silence, as with Bill Bruford's contribution to the improvised "Trio". Rather than using the standard jazz or rock "jamming" format for improvisation (in which one soloist at a time takes centre stage while the rest of the band lies back and plays along with established rhythm and chord changes), King Crimson improvisation is musicians collectively making creative decisions and contributions as the music is being played. Individual soloing is largely eschewed; each musician is to listen to each other and to the group sound, to be able to react creatively within the group dynamic. Fripp has used the metaphor of "magic" to describe this process, in particular when the method works particularly well.

Similarly, King Crimson's improvised music is varied in sound and the band has been able to release several box sets and albums consisting mostly or entirely of improvised music, such as the THRaKaTTaK album, and the band's series of ProjeKcts. Occasionally, particular improvised pieces will be recalled and reworked in different forms at different shows, becoming more and more refined and eventually appearing on official studio releases.

Influence and legacy 
King Crimson have been influential both on the early 1970s progressive rock movement and numerous contemporary artists. Genesis and Yes were directly influenced by the band's usage of the mellotron, and many King Crimson band members were involved in other notable bands: Lake in Emerson, Lake & Palmer; McDonald in Foreigner; Burrell in Bad Company, and Wetton in U.K. and Asia. Canadian rock band Rush's drummer Neil Peart credited the adventurous and innovative style of Michael Giles on his own approach to percussion.

King Crimson's influence extends to many bands from diverse genres, especially of the 1990s and 2000s. Kurt Cobain, the frontman of the grunge band Nirvana, had stated that the album Red had a major influence on the sound of their final studio album In Utero. Tool are known to be heavily influenced by King Crimson, with vocalist Maynard James Keenan joking on a tour with them: "Now you know who we ripped off. Just don't tell anyone, especially the members of King Crimson." Modern progressive, experimental, psychedelic and indie rock bands have cited them as an influence as well, including the Mars Volta, Primus, Mystery Jets, Fanfarlo, Phish, and Anekdoten, who first practiced together playing King Crimson songs. Steven Wilson, the leader of Porcupine Tree, was responsible for remixing King Crimson's back catalogue in surround sound and said that the process had an enormous influence on his solo albums, and his band was influenced by King Crimson. In November 2012 the Flaming Lips in collaboration with Stardeath and White Dwarfs released a track-by-track reinterpretation of In the Court of the Crimson King entitled Playing Hide and Seek with the Ghosts of Dawn. Colin Newman, of Wire, said he saw King Crimson perform many times, and that they influenced him deeply. The seminal hardcore punk group Black Flag acknowledge Wetton-era King Crimson as an influence on their experimental period in the mid-1980s. Melvin Gibbs said that the Rollins Band was influenced most by King Crimson, using similar chords. Bad Religion cites the lyrics of "21st Century Schizoid Man" on their single "21st Century (Digital Boy)" and the name of their record label, Epitaph (founded by their guitarist Brett Gurewitz), comes from the song of the same name on Crimson's debut album. Living Colour guitarist Vernon Reid considered Robert Fripp as one of his guitar influences.

King Crimson have frequently been cited as pioneers of progressive metal and as an influence on bands of this genre, including Opeth, Mastodon, Between the Buried and Me, Leprous, Haken, the Ocean, Caligula's Horse, Last Chance to Reason, and Indukti. Members of metal bands Mudvayne, Voivod, Enslaved, Yob, Pyrrhon, and Pallbearer have cited King Crimson as an influence. Heavy experimental and avant-garde acts like the Dillinger Escape Plan, Neurosis, Zeni Geva, Ancestors, and Oranssi Pazuzu all cite King Crimson's influence.

Other artists affected by King Crimson include video game composer Nobuo Uematsu, noise music artist Masami Akita of Merzbow, jazz guitarist Dennis Rea of Land, folktronica exponent Juana Molina, hip hop producer RJD2, hip hop and soul composer Adrian Younge, film director Hal Hartley, and folk-pop singer Ian Kelly.

Members 

Final lineup
Robert Fripp – guitar, keyboards, mellotron, electronics 
Mel Collins – saxophones, flute, bass flute, clarinet, bass clarinet, mellotron, backing vocals 
Tony Levin – bass, Chapman stick, synthesisers, backing vocals 
Pat Mastelotto – drums, percussion, programming 
Gavin Harrison – drums, percussion 
Jakko Jakszyk – lead vocals, guitar, flute, keyboards 
Jeremy Stacey – drums, keyboards, backing vocals 

Former members
Michael Giles – drums, percussion, backing vocals 
Ian McDonald – saxophone, flute, clarinet, bass clarinet, keyboards, mellotron, vibraphone, backing vocals  
Peter Sinfield – lyrics, lighting, synthesizer 
Greg Lake – bass, lead vocals  
Gordon Haskell – bass, lead vocals  
Andy McCulloch – drums 
Ian Wallace – drums, percussion, backing vocals  
Boz Burrell – bass, lead vocals  
John Wetton – bass, lead vocals  
Jamie Muir – percussion 
Bill Bruford – drums, percussion 
David Cross – violin, viola, keyboards 
Adrian Belew – guitar, lead vocals, drums and percussion 
Trey Gunn – Warr guitar, Chapman stick, backing vocals, bass 
Bill Rieflin – keyboards, synthesizer, mellotron, drums, percussion  ; inactive

Discography 

 In the Court of the Crimson King (1969)
 In the Wake of Poseidon (1970)
 Lizard (1970)
 Islands (1971)
 Larks' Tongues in Aspic (1973)
 Starless and Bible Black (1974)
 Red (1974)
 Discipline (1981)
 Beat (1982)
 Three of a Perfect Pair (1984)
 Thrak (1995)
 The Construkction of Light (2000)
 The Power to Believe (2003)

Citations

General references

External links 

 Discipline Global Mobile Live
 Crimson Jazz Trio
 Elephant Talk
 ProjeKction
 
 

 
Articles which contain graphical timelines
Atlantic Records artists
Caroline Records artists
Discipline Global Mobile artists
E.G. Records artists
English art rock groups
English progressive rock groups
Free improvisation ensembles
Island Records artists
Musical groups disestablished in 1974
Musical groups disestablished in 1984
Musical groups disestablished in 2004
Musical groups disestablished in 2008
Musical groups established in 1968
Musical groups reestablished in 1981
Musical groups reestablished in 1994
Musical groups reestablished in 2007
Musical groups reestablished in 2013
Musical quartets
Musical quintets
Polydor Records artists
Post-progressive musicians
Symphonic rock groups
Vertigo Records artists
Virgin Records artists
Warner Records artists